was a town located in Abu District, Yamaguchi Prefecture, Japan.

As of 2003, the town had an estimated population of 8,006 and a density of 27.32 persons per km². The total area was 293.08 km².

On January 16, 2010, Atō was merged into the expanded city of Yamaguchi.

External links
Yamaguchi City official website 

Dissolved municipalities of Yamaguchi Prefecture